Marcus Alexander Fulton (March 9, 1836August 4, 1892) was an American businessman, politician, and Wisconsin pioneer.  He was the 17th mayor of Hudson, Wisconsin, (1878) and represented northwest Wisconsin in the State Senate (1866, 1867) and Assembly (1865, 1868).

Early life
Fulton was born in Bethel, New York, in March 1836.  In 1854, he moved to Hudson, Wisconsin, with his parents and siblings.

Career
In Hudson, their father became a pioneer merchant in the northwest, but died just four years after their arrival, in 1858.  Fulton and his brother, David, inherited the business and operated it successfully, moving from general merchandise into real estate dealing.

Fulton also became involved in politics; in 1864, he was elected to the Wisconsin State Assembly running on the National Union Party ticket.  He represented a district comprising all of Pierce and St. Croix counties.  Rather than running for re-election, he ran for Wisconsin State Senate in 1865 and won election in the 28th Senate district, running as a Republican.  At the end of his two year term in the Senate, he won another term in the Assembly.  He ultimately served in the 18th, 19th, 20th, and 21st legislative terms.

After his terms in the Legislature, Fulton became associated with the Liberal Republican faction of Horace Greeley, and—with his brother—started the True Republican, a Liberal Republican newspaper in Hudson.  Fulton soon became a Democrat as the Liberal Republicans merged into that party in the mid 1870s. 

In the 1870s, both Fulton brothers served as mayor of Hudson, Wisconsin.  David Fulton was elected in 1877, and Marcus was then elected in 1878. He also served on the Hudson board of education and city council.

Later in life he was an advocate for silver coinage, and wrote letters published in newspapers around the country under the pen name "Village Merchant".

Personal life and family
Marcus Fulton was a son of James Fulton.  He had at least one younger brother, David C. Fulton, who also represented  in the Wisconsin State Assembly, was the 16th mayor of Hudson, Wisconsin, and served as U.S. marshal for western Wisconsin in the 1880s.  The Fultons were descended from Scottish emigrants who arrived in America in 1770.  Marcus Fulton's grandfather fought in the War of 1812.

Marcus Fulton married Mercy Augusta Ansley on April 9, 1863.  They had six children together, though at least one died in infancy.  After his first wife's death in 1876, Fulton married her sister, Adelia Frances Ansley, in 1877, and had at least four more children.

Fulton died of a stroke at his home in Hudson on August 4, 1892.

Notes

References

External links
Geni.com
Wisconsin Historical Society

1836 births
1892 deaths
Businesspeople from Wisconsin
People from Bethel, New York
People from Hudson, Wisconsin
Members of the Wisconsin State Assembly
Wisconsin state senators
Mayors of places in Wisconsin
Wisconsin city council members
School board members in Wisconsin
19th-century American businesspeople
American people of Scottish descent